The Martin Luther King Jr. National Historical Park covers about 35 acres (0.14 km2) and includes several sites in Atlanta, Georgia related to the life and work of civil rights leader Martin Luther King Jr.  Within the park is his boyhood home, and Ebenezer Baptist Church — the church where King was baptized and both he and his father, Martin Luther King Sr., were pastors — as well as, the grave site of King, Jr., and his wife, civil rights activist Coretta Scott King.

The park is administered by the National Park Service and has a visitor's center and museum.

History
These places, critical to the interpretation of the life of Martin Luther King Jr. and his legacy as a leader of the American civil rights movement, were originally included in the National Historic Site or National Historic Landmark listings first established on October 10, 1980. The site was expanded and designated as a national historical park through a bipartisan bill long championed by John Lewis and signed on January 8, 2018, by President Donald Trump.

In total, the buildings included in the site make up 35 acres (0.14 km2). The visitor center contains a museum that chronicles the American Civil Rights Movement and the path of Martin Luther King Jr. The King Center for Nonviolent Social Change includes the burial place of King, and his wife, activist Coretta Scott King.  An 1894 firehouse (Fire Station No. 6) served the Sweet Auburn community until 1991, and now contains a gift shop and an exhibit on desegregation in the Atlanta Fire Department. The "I Have a Dream" International World Peace Rose Garden, and a memorial tribute to Mohandas K. Gandhi are part of the site, as is the "International Civil Rights Walk of Fame" which commemorates some of the courageous pioneers who worked for social justice.

In 2019, the National Park Foundation purchased the Life Home of Dr. Martin Luther King Jr. on Sunset Avenue, where the family moved in 1965, from the estate of Coretta Scott King and transferred it to the National Park Service for restoration before it is opened to the public as an expansion of the National Historic Park.

Annual events celebrating Martin Luther King Jr. Day in January typically draw large crowds. Speakers have included Presidents of the United States, national and local politicians, and civil rights leaders. Remembrances are also held during Black History Month (February), and on the anniversary of King's April 4, 1968, assassination in Memphis, Tennessee.

Preservation

The Martin Luther King Jr. Historic District, an area bounded roughly by Irwin, Randolph, Edgewood, Jackson, and Auburn avenues, was listed on the U.S. National Register of Historic Places on May 2, 1974.  The district included Ebenezer Baptist Church, King's grave site and memorial, Dr. King's birthplace, shotgun row houses, Victorian houses, the Atlanta Baptist Preparatory Institute site, Our Lady of Lourdes Catholic Church, Fire Station No. 6, and the Triangle Building at the intersection of Old Wheat Street and Auburn Avenue.

Much of the area was designated as a national historic landmark district on May 5, 1977. The Trust for Public Land purchased 5 single-family homes along Auburn Avenue in the late 1970s, the same block Martin Luther King Jr. grew up on.  The Trust for Public Land purchased more than a dozen properties over the next 20 years to create a parking lot as well as a pedestrian greenway to link the King district to the Jimmy Carter Presidential Center.  In 2008, The Trust for Public Land acquired one of the remaining historic properties in the neighborhood, on the corner of Auburn Avenue.

By U.S. Congressional legislation, the site with associated buildings and gardens was authorized as a national historic site on October 10, 1980; it is administered by the National Park Service (NPS).  A  area including 35 contributing properties was covered, including 22 previously included in the NRHP historic district. The area covered in the NRHP designation was enlarged on June 12, 2001. In 2018, it was redesignated as a national historical park, adding Prince Hall Masonic Temple to the protected area.

Martin Luther King Jr.'s Birth Home

The King Birth Home is located at 501 Auburn Avenue in the Sweet Auburn Historic District. Built in 1895, it sits about a block east of Ebenezer Baptist Church. King's maternal grandparents, Reverend Adam Daniel (A.D.) Williams, who was pastor of the Ebenezer Baptist Church, and his wife, Jennie Williams, bought the house for $3,500 in 1909. In 1926, when King's father married Alberta Williams, the couple moved into the house, where King Jr. was born in 1929.

The King family lived in the house until 1941. It was then converted into a two-family dwelling. The Rev. A. D. Williams King, Dr. King's brother, lived on the second floor in the 1950s and early 1960s.

The first level includes the front porch, parlor, study, dining room, kitchen, laundry, bedroom and a bathroom. The second level includes four bedrooms and a bathroom. The visitor center offers free tours of the house led by National Park Service rangers, but with limited availability.

The King Center

In 1968, after King's death, Coretta Scott King founded the Martin Luther King Jr. Center for Nonviolent Social Change ( the King Center). Since 1981, the center has been housed in a building that is part of the King complex located on Auburn Avenue adjacent to Ebenezer Baptist Church.
In 1977, a memorial tomb was dedicated to King. His remains were moved to the tomb, on a plaza between the center and the church. King's gravesite and a reflecting pool are located next to Freedom Hall. After her death, Mrs. King was interred with her husband on February 7, 2006. An eternal flame is located nearby.

Freedom Hall at 449 Auburn Avenue features exhibits about Dr. and Mrs. King, Mahatma Gandhi and American activist Rosa Parks. It hosts special events and programs associated with civil rights and social justice. It contains a Grand Foyer, large theater/conference auditorium, bookstore and resource center, and various works of art from across the globe. The Grand Foyer features art from Africa and Georgia. The paneling lining the staircase is from the sapeli tree, which grows in Nigeria.

In 1990, Behold, a statue honoring Martin Luther King Jr., was dedicated near Ebenezer Baptist Church.

As of 2006, the King Center is a privately owned inholding within the authorized boundaries of the park. The King family has debated among themselves as to whether they should sell it to the National Park Service to ensure preservation.

Visitor center

The visitor center at 449 Auburn Avenue was built in 1996 and features the multimedia exhibit Courage To Lead, which follows the parallel paths of Dr. Martin Luther King Jr. and the Civil Rights Movement. Visitors can also walk down a stylized "Freedom Road". The Children of Courage exhibit, geared towards children, tells the story of the children of the Civil Rights Movement with a challenge to our youth today. Video programs are presented on a continuing basis and there is a staffed information desk.

Gandhi Promenade
The statue of Mohandas Gandhi was donated by the Indian Council for Cultural Relations, India, in collaboration with The National Federation of Indian American Associations and The Embassy of India, USA. The inscribed bronze plaque reads:

International Civil Rights Walk of Fame
 
The International Civil Rights Walk of Fame was created in 2004 and honors some of the participants in the Civil Rights Movement. The walk along the Promenade, includes footsteps, marked in granite and bronze. According to the National Park Service, the Walk of Fame was created to "pay homage to the "brave warriors" of justice who sacrificed and struggled to make equality a reality for all." The new addition to the area is expected to enhance the historic value of the area, enrich cultural heritage, and augment tourist attractions.

The Walk of Fame is the brainchild of Xernona Clayton, founder and executive producer of the renowned Trumpet Awards and a civil rights activist in her own right. Ms. Clayton said, "This is a lasting memorial to those whose contributions were testaments to the fact that human progress is neither automatic nor inevitable. This historic site will serve as a symbol of pride and a beacon of hope for all future generations. We are looking forward to building a monument to the civil struggle that depicts every step taken toward the goal of justice and the tireless exertions and passionate concern of these dedicated individuals."

Prince Hall
Located at 332 Auburn Avenue, the Prince Hall Masonic Temple is where the Southern Christian Leadership Conference (SCLC) established its initial headquarters in 1957.  This historic and distinguished civil rights organization was co-founded by Dr. King, who also served as its first president.  Owned by the Most Worshipful Prince Hall Grand Lodge of Georgia, the building was included within the authorized boundary of the park in 2018.

Photo gallery

See also

List of memorials to Martin Luther King Jr.
List of National Historic Landmarks in Georgia (U.S. state)
National Register of Historic Places listings in Fulton County, Georgia
List of areas in the United States National Park System#National historical parks
Auburn Avenue Research Library on African American Culture and History
Behold, 1990 statue

Notes

References

 Coleman, Wim. Martin Luther King Jr. National Historic Site, Enslow Pub. Inc, (2005) -

External links

Official NPS website: Martin Luther King Jr. National Historical Park
Ebenezer Baptist Church official site
The King Center
International Civil Rights Walk Of Fame Announces 2008 Inductees
International Civil Rights Walk of Fame
Atlanta, Georgia, a National Park Service Discover Our Shared Heritage Travel Itinerary

 
Civil rights movement museums
Historic districts on the National Register of Historic Places in Georgia (U.S. state)
King, Martin Luther
National Register of Historic Places in Atlanta
Protected areas established in 1980
1980 establishments in Georgia (U.S. state)
National Historical Parks of the United States